The anime adaptation of Magic Knight Rayearth aired first on Japan's Yomiuri TV on October 17, 1994, and ended on November 27, 1995. It was directed by Toshihiro Hirano and co-produced by Yomiuri TV and Tokyo Movie Shinsha (now TMS Entertainment). The anime had 2 seasons, lasting 49 episodes altogether. The TV series is licensed in the U.S. by Media Blasters, now by Discotek Media and is dubbed by Bang Zoom! Entertainment. It was released on both VHS and DVD and now on Blu-ray.

Episode list

First season (1994-1995)

Second season (1995)

References

Magic Knight Rayearth
Episodes